The 2022 NCAA Division I Cross Country Championships was the 84th annual NCAA Men's Division I Cross Country Championship and the 42nd annual NCAA Women's Division I Cross Country Championship to determine the team and individual national champions of NCAA Division men's and women's collegiate cross country running in the United States.

These championships were hosted by Oklahoma State University at the OSU Cross Country Course in Stillwater, Oklahoma.

In all, four different titles were contested: men's and women's individual and team championships.

Television 
ESPN will broadcast on television and there will be streaming on ESPN2, ESPN3, and ESPNU.

Women's Team Result (Top 10)

Women's Individual Result (Top 10)

Men's Team Result (Top 10)

Men's Individual Result (Top 10)

See also 

 NCAA Men's Division II Cross Country Championship
 NCAA Women's Division II Cross Country Championship
 NCAA Men's Division III Cross Country Championship
 NCAA Women's Division III Cross Country Championship

Results 
 2022 NCAA Division I Cross Country Championships results

References 

Stillwater, Oklahoma
NCAA Cross Country Championships
Track and field in Oklahoma
Oklahoma State University
NCAA Division I Cross Country Championships
NCAA Division I Cross Country Championships
NCAA Division I Cross Country Championships